Tarek Alarabi Tourgane (22 August 1959) is a Syrian composer and singer of Algerian descent,  best known for composing the theme songs for animated series in the Arab world. 

He worked for Spacetoon channel and the Syrian cartoon dubbing company, Venus Centre, and composed most of the songs for the cartoon and anime programs shown on the channel, and participated in singing many of them.

Career 
At the beginning of the 1990s, Tariq joined the Venus Centre, and his first work was the song of the anime series The Jungle Book.

He has over 1500 songs written, composed and sung by him, which have an impact on many generations. He also presented many successful concerts and participated in many festivals and events.

Personal life 
He is married and has two daughters and one son: Dema, Tala, and Mohammed. all of whom sing along with him.

References

External links 
Tarek Alarabi Tourgane on Elcinema

Syrian people of Algerian descent
Singers who perform in Classical Arabic
20th-century Syrian male singers
Syrian composers
1959 births
Syrian writers
Living people
21st-century Syrian male singers